The William A. Carr Plantation was a small cotton plantation of  in northwestern Leon County, Florida, established by William A. Carr.

Location
The land was situated at the northern tip of Lake Carr and encompassed what is now the small unincorporated African American community of Blocker and the Cedar Hill Road area. Carr Lane, a road in northern Leon County just off Bannerman Road, is the remnant of William Carr in the area.

Statistics
The Leon County, Florida 1860 Agricultural Census shows that the William A. Carr Plantation had the following:
 Improved land: 1000 acres (4 km2)
 Unimproved land: 1000 acres (4 km2)
 Cash value of plantation: $31,000
 Cash value of farm implements/machinery: $1000
 Cash value of farm animals: $5,000	 
 Number of enslaved persons: 77
 Bushels of corn: 5000
 Bales of cotton: 260

Owner
William Carr was originally from Virginia. Outside of agriculture, Carr was a stockholder with the Georgia Railroad and Banking Company in 1838.
In 1840, Carr was a complainant in a land case before the United States Supreme Court.
Carr was also one of the first teachers at the all-black McBride School.

Notes

References
 Rootsweb Plantations
 Largest Slaveholders from 1860 Slave Census Sschedules
 Paisley, Clifton; From Cotton To Quail, University of Florida Press, c 1968.

External links
 Carr v. Duval - 39 U.S. 77 (1840).

Plantations in Leon County, Florida
Cotton plantations in Florida